The 2011–12 Butler Bulldogs women's basketball team represented Butler University in the 2011–12 NCAA Division I women's basketball season. Their head coach was Beth Couture, serving her 10th year. The Bulldogs played their home games at the Hinkle Fieldhouse, which has a capacity of approximately 10,000. This was Butler's last season competing in the Horizon League.

Roster

Source:  2011-12 Butler Women's Basketball Roster

Schedule

|-
!colspan=9 style="background:#13294B; color:#FFFFFF;"| Exhibition

|-
!colspan=9 style="background:#13294B; color:#FFFFFF;"| Non-Conference Regular Season

|-
!colspan=9 style="background:#13294B; color:#FFFFFF;"| Horizon League Play

|-
!colspan=9 style="background:#13294B; color:#FFFFFF;"| Horizon League Tournament

Source:  2011-12 Butler Bulldogs women's basketball schedule

References

Butler
Butler Bulldogs women's basketball seasons
Butler
Butler